Life Goes On is a studio album by jazz vocalist Stevie Holland. It is Holland’s eighth album and was released on June 30, 2015, by 150 Music.

Track listing

Personnel
 Todd Barkan, producer
 Gary William Friedman, arrangements
 Randy Ingram, piano
 Peter Brendler, bass
 Jeff Davis, drums
 Nicholas Payton, trumpet
 Jacob Yates, cello

References

2015 albums
Stevie Holland albums